Munisuvrata was the twentieth tirthankara of the present half time cycle (avasarpini) in Jain cosmology. He became a siddha, a liberated soul which has destroyed all of his karma. Events of the Jaina version of Ramayana are placed at the time of Munisuvrata. Munisuvrata lived for over 30,000 years. His chief apostle (gaṇadhara) was sage Malli Svāmi.

Legends
Munisuvrata was the twentieth tirthankara of the present half time cycle (avasarpini) in Jain cosmology. Jain texts like padmapurana place him as a contemporary of Rama. According to Jain texts, Munisuvrata was born as 54 lakh years passed after the birth of the nineteenth tirthankara, Mallinātha. According to Jain beliefs, Munisuvrata descended from the heaven called Ānata kalpa on the twelfth day of the bright half of the month of Āśvina – āśvina śukla dvādaśi– to queen Padmavati and king Sumitra. On the third day of Shraavana (month) Krishna (dark fortnight) according to Hindu calendar, queen Padmavati of Rajgir saw sixteen auspicious dreams. When she shared her dreams with her husband, king Sumitra of the Harivamsa clan, he explained that a tirthankara will be born to them soon. Then, Munisuvrata was born to them on the fifteenth day of the Shraavana Shukla (bright fortnight) in 1,184,980 BC. His height is mentioned to be 20 bows (60 metres) and complexion as a dark one.

According to Jain texts, after spending 7,500 years as a youth, Munisuvrata is believed to have ruled his kingdom for 15,000 years (rājyakāla). He then renounced all worldly pursuits and became a monk. According to Jain beliefs, he spent 11 months performing karma-destroying austerities and then attained the all-embracing knowledge – Omniscience (kevala jñāna) under a Champaka tree. He is said to have 18 ganadharas headed by Malli. Puspavati or Puspadatta is believed to be the head-nun of his order. Samayavayanga sutra, however, names Kumbha and Amila as the head ganadhara and head nun respectively.

Munisuvrata is said to have lived for over 30,000 years and attained liberation (nirvāña) from Sammeda śikhara on the twelfth day of the dark half of the month of phālguna – phālguna kṛṣna dvādaśi. Varuna is mentioned to be his yaksha and his yakhsini is named Bahurupini in Digambara tradition and Naradatta in Svetambara tradition.

Munisuvrata finds mentions in Jain texts like Uttarapurana and Tiloyapannati.

Adoration
Svayambhustotra by Acharya Samantabhadra is the adoration of twenty-four tirthankaras. Its five slokas (aphorisms) adore the qualities of Munisuvrata.

An idol of Munisuvrata was installed in 127 AD or 157 AD in the Devanirmita stupa, Mathura.

Iconography
Munisuvrata is usually depicted in a sitting (or standing) meditative pose, with a tortoise symbol beneath him; each tīrthankara has a distinct emblem, which allows worshippers to distinguish similar idols. Jivantasvami represents Munisuvrata as a princely state. The Jina is represented as standing in the kayotsarga pose wearing crown and ornaments.

Colossal statues 
 Statue of Purity is a  statue dedicated to Munisuvrata under construction in Bhora Kalan, Haryana.
 A  black stone statue of Munisuvrata was installed in Jainaragutti near Adagur in the state of Karnataka.
 A  idolf of Munisuvrata is installed near the Shantinath Jain Teerth, Maharashtra.

Main Temples
 Chaturmukha Basadi is a famous Jain temple located at Karkala in the Indian state of Karnataka. The temple is dedicated to Tirthankara Aranatha, Māllīnātha and Munisuvrata.
 Shri Munisuvrata-Nemi-Parshva Jinalaya located at Santhu, Rajasthan
 Paithan Jain Tirth
 Keshoraipatan Jain temple

See also

God in Jainism
Arihant (Jainism)
Jainism and non-creationism

References

Citations

Sources
 
 
 
 
 
 
 
 

Tirthankaras
Jain saints
Jainism in Mithila